Marilyn Wilson-Rutherford (née Rovell; born February 6, 1948) is an American singer who is best known as the first wife of the Beach Boys' Brian Wilson. Raised in Los Angeles, she started her singing career in the late 1950s, initially as part of a family singing trio, the Rovell Sisters, with her siblings Diane and Barbara. Through a mutual connection with musician Gary Usher, Marilyn met Brian at a Beach Boys concert in August 1962 when she was 14 and Brian was 20. Brian subsequently renamed the Rovell Sisters to "the Honeys" and wrote and produced several of their records in the 1960s.

Marilyn married Brian in December 1964 and together had two children, Carnie and Wendy Wilson, who later formed two-thirds of Wilson Phillips. The couple's early marital struggles were reflected in the pessimistic and dejected lyrical content from the Beach Boys' 1966 album Pet Sounds (particularly the songs "Caroline, No" and "You Still Believe in Me"). In 1971, she and Diane formed American Spring, with Brian again acting as producer and songwriter. Marilyn and Brian ultimately divorced in 1979, due in part to Brian's longstanding issues with mental illness and drug abuse. She continues to occasionally perform concerts with the Honeys.

Background and early singing career
Marilyn Rovell was born on February 6, 1948, in Chicago, the second daughter of Mae Gausmann and Irving Rovell (originally Rovelski). Her father was the owner and operator of a hand laundry. She has two sisters: Diane (born 1945) and Barbara (born 1949). In 1955, the Rovell family moved to a two-bedroom house at 616 North Sierra Bonita Avenue in Los Angeles. Her father took a job as a metal worker for the Lockheed Aircraft Corporation and, on the weekends, a part-time job as a clothing salesman. Biographer Steven Gaines wrote that the family "were what the decidedly anti-Semitic Hawthorne crowd considered 'Fairfax Jews'".

The family soon purchased an upright piano for their living room. In Gaines' description, "Mae was the musical one in the family", and all of her daughters "had strong, harmonious voices and loved to sing". According to biographer James Murphy, "Their home was filled with music and the girls spent hours gathered around Mae’s piano singing their favorite songs by the Andrews Sisters and the McGuire Sisters." By 1958, Marilyn and her sisters had formed a music trio, known as "the Rovell Sisters". whose act featured renditions of songs such as the McGuire Sisters' "Ding Dong" and "Sugartime". The Rovell Sisters appeared on local television programs and competed in talent contests. Marilyn and Diane attended Fairfax High School.

The Honeys and American Spring

Marilyn met Brian Wilson when she attended a Beach Boys concert at Pandora's Box, a Sunset Strip nightclub, in August 1962 with Diane and their cousin Ginger Blake, who was dating Wilson's collaborator Gary Usher. According to Marilyn, "I was drinking hot chocolate. After they finished their song, Brian looked at me and said, ‘Can I have a sip?’ I said, ‘Sure’ and, as he gave it back to me, it spilled all over me and we started laughing. That’s how we met." Later, Wilson's song "All Summer Long" nodded to their first meeting with the lyric "Remember when you spilled Coke all over your blouse?"

Brian prevailed upon Capitol Records to sign the Rovell sisters, whom he rechristened "the Honeys", envisioning them as a female counterpart to the Beach Boys. The company released several Honeys recordings as singles, although they sold poorly. Several years later, Marilyn and Diane formed the music duo American Spring, a collaboration with Brian and musician David Sandler.  Released in July 1972, the group's only album Spring was critically acclaimed but failed to chart.

Early relationship with Wilson and Pet Sounds
Marilyn began dating Brian Wilson when she was 15 and he was 21. They initially concealed their relationship from outsiders. Brian was closely acquainted with the Rovell family, and from 1963 to 1964, was allowed to make their home his primary residence. Gaines writes that the couple shared a bedroom, but slept in different beds, an arrangement that "didn't seem to raise any eyebrows at the Rovell household, although [her parents] were particularly moral and conservative". Inspired by a remark from Diane, Brian later wrote "Don't Hurt My Little Sister" about the affair. Gaines adds that, from the onset of the couple's relationship, it "was often unclear to outsiders exactly which sister Brian loved best", and Marilyn and Diane had "found themselves caught up in a benign competition" that persisted even after Marilyn had married Brian.

In between her time spent recording and performing, Marilyn worked at a doughnut shop, and enrolled in Hollywood Professional School with Diane. Brian moved out of the Rovells' home in late 1964, after which Marilyn's relationship turned more serious. She recalled, "I had started falling in love with him. I knew he really liked me and I knew that he cared for me, but I didn't think he was in love with me." According to Gaines, some source report that Brian's family and friends "were strongly against Brian's involvement with a Jewish girl, and it took them years to appreciate Marilyn and her family".

On November 1, 1964, Wilson and his bandmates embarked on their second overseas tour. He later recalled that immediately before boarding his flight, he had suspected that Marilyn had been in love with Mike Love. "By the way she was looking at him, I thought she was in love with Mike. I had a nervous breakdown over it." In Marilyn's version of the events that day, she had overheard Brian and his cousin discussing how they were "going to have a blast" together on various escapades throughout the tour. Marilyn then remarked, "I hope you guys enjoy yourselves, because I'm going to have a good time too." During the subsequent flight, Wilson had a panic attack and sent two telegrams to Marilyn proposing that they marry.

Brian and Marilyn were married on December 7, 1964. Within weeks, Wilson had a nervous breakdown that he attributed, in part, to himself and Marilyn not "getting along too good". Marilyn took her husband to see a psychiatrist, who declared that Brian's issues were merely a result of temporary exhaustion. Further conflicts in their marriage were exacerbated by his progressive drug habits, spurred on by a new friendship with talent agent Loren Schwartz. Following unsuccessful attempts to dissuade him from his constant fraternizing with Schwartz, Marilyn separated from Brian for at least a month. She later said, "He wasn't devastated at all [by my leaving]. ... I think he was too involved with the drug thing." Marilyn later reconciled with her husband and returned to live with him.

Much of the lyrical content from the Beach Boys' Pet Sounds reflected the couple's early marital struggles. Marilyn felt that her relationship with Brian was a central thematic reference, particularly for "You Still Believe in Me" and "Caroline, No". "Wouldn't It Be Nice" was similarly inspired by Brian's feelings for Diane. According to the album's lyricist, Tony Asher, Brian was visibly "confused about love", having displayed a fierce preoccupation with teenage girls and an infatuation with Diane for the duration of the album's writing sessions.

Bel Air and children

In early 1967, the couple put their Laurel Way house up for sale and took residence at a newly purchased Bel Air mansion on Bellagio Road. Marilyn told Gaines that they moved because her husband had "wanted a bigger home", but according to Badman, the move was to extricate themselves from Brian's "hanger-ons". She referred to Brian's friends as "drainers", a sentiment shared by the rest of Wilson's family, who felt that acquaintances such as Van Dyke Parks and Danny Hutton were enabling Brian's self-destructive behavior and drug habits.  To keep away strangers, Marilyn went so far as to install a high brick wall and an electronically-controlled gate around the estate.

Marilyn and Brian had two daughters, Carnie and Wendy (born 1968 and 1969, respectively), who later had musical success of their own as two-thirds of the group Wilson Phillips. Marilyn said that her husband completely "backed out" of the responsibility of raising their children because he felt that he was an unfit parent. She remembered "really getting worried about Brian" around this time, explaining that she felt there "was suddenly a difference between having fun and having sick fun ... once you have a child you look at things differently". Carnie remembered her mother explaining to her as a child that her father "was not like other dads. He'll never be able to be a father like your friends have."

By 1969, Gaines writes, "Marilyn's romantic and sexual life with Brian had virtually ended" amid his growing infatuation with Diane. A few years into their marriage, Marilyn was encouraged by her husband to have affairs with other men, including songwriter Tandyn Almer. In her recollection, she felt that Brian's insistence was just "funny' at the time, and she agreed to a threesome with him and Almer on at least one occasion. In turn, Wilson had a simultaneous affair with Diane. Marilyn eventually banished Diane from their Bellagio home in late 1973.

Continued struggles with Wilson

Responding to accusations of neglect, Marilyn stated that she sought professional help for her husband for many years, but was unable "to find someone who could deal with him on his own level". Conversely, Gaines reported that "no professional help" had been sought. Wilson's mother Audree told a journalist, "It would get to the point where Marilyn really thought Brian needed help; then he seemed okay, and she'd sort of forget about it, not necessarily talking to him about it at all." In early 1975, Marilyn consulted Brian's cousin, Stephen Love, telling him that she was considering having Brian committed to a psychiatric hospital and divorce him if he continued to refuse counseling. Love countered that it was preferable to hire Stan, his younger brother, as Brian's caretaker.

The arrangement with Stan persisted for several months, after which Marilyn successfully persuaded Brian to volunteer himself as a patient under psychologist Eugene Landy's 24-hour therapy regimen. In 1976, Brian recorded an original song called "Marilyn Rovell", a dedication to his wife, although the track remains unreleased. The 1977 album The Beach Boys Love You included "Let's Put Our Hearts Together", a duet between the couple. In December 1976, after Landy raised his fee, Marilyn relieved Landy of his services and a new psychiatrist was immediately brought to Brian. When the psychiatrist died in an accident soon thereafter, Stan was reemployed as Brian's caretaker, now working alongside professional model Rocky Pamplin in keeping Brian stable and sober.

Three weeks after Pamplin had been hired as Wilson's bodyguard, Marilyn began having an affair with the model, concealed from Brian, that lasted until January 1979. According to Marilyn, she ended her relationship with Pamplin after Pamplin had declared he would be recording his own album with Brian as producer. She recalled, "I looked at [Rocky and Stan] and said, 'You ... expect me to go along with you? I'm not going to lie about Brian for your benefit.' I won't have anyone lie about Brian. ... I fired them the next day." Conversely, in Brian's 1991 memoir, Wouldn't It Be Nice: My Own Story, it is stated that Marilyn had "pushed" Brian into producing the songs "California Feelin'" and "Don't Be Cruel" for Pamplin.

Separation and later years
In July 1978, Wilson and Marilyn separated, with Wilson filing for divorce in January 1979. Marilyn was given custody of their children and half of a share of Wilson's songwriting royalties. She and her children later moved to a home in Encino, California. According to Gaines, "Brian continued to depend on Marilyn for encouragement and stability, and kept in close telephone contact with her." Marilyn and the children were not allowed to contact Wilson during the period in which he was readmitted into Landy's program in the 1980s.

Since her divorce from Wilson, Marilyn became a real estate broker. On her 47th birthday, she attended her ex-husband's wedding to Melinda Ledbetter. Wilson purposely chose Marilyn's birthday for the wedding ceremony date so that it would be easy to remember for future anniversaries.

In 2022, Marilyn filed a $6.7 million suit against Wilson regarding "copyright termination interests" after Wilson had sold his publishing rights to Universal Music Publishing Group for $50 million.

Fictional depictions
 In the 2014 biopic Love & Mercy, Marilyn is portrayed by Erin Darke.

Notes

References

Bibliography

Further reading

External links

Living people
American women pop singers
1948 births
Brian Wilson
Wilson family (The Beach Boys)
American people of Jewish descent
Singers from Los Angeles